This is a List of World Championships medalists in sailing in sailboard classes.

World Sailing Event - Youth Sailing World Championships

The RS:X has been used as equipment in the Youth Sailing World Championships which is for sailors under 19.

Mistral Boys

Mistral Girls

Techno 293 Boys

Techno 293 Girls

RS:X Boys

RS:X Girls

World Sailing Event - IYRU Women's Sailing World Championships

World Sailing Special Event - PWA World Champion

Aloha (windsurfer)

Lechner A390

Men's

Women's

Mistral

Men's

Women's

Mistral Junior

Formula Windsurfing

RS:X

Men

Women

Youth Male

Youth Female

Techno 293

Windsurfer Class World Champions

See also
Windsurfing World Championships

References

Sailboard